The 1907 UCI Track Cycling World Championships were the World Championship for track cycling. They took place in Paris, France from 4 to 7 July 1907. Four events for men were contested, two for professionals and two for amateurs.

Medal summary

Participants

Netherlands 
Dorus Nijland (amateur sprint)
Jan Tulleken

Medal table

References

Track cycling
UCI Track Cycling World Championships by year
International cycle races hosted by France
Uci
1907 in track cycling